Microblepsis violacea is a moth in the family Drepanidae first described by Arthur Gardiner Butler in 1889. It is found in north-western and north-eastern India, Taiwan and China (Szechwan, Yunnan, Kwangtung, Chekiang, Fukien).

The wingspan is 25–36 mm.: the males of the antennae are double-toothed, and the females are filamentous; the overall color is quite uniform in gray-purple color, the top of the head, the front edge of the fore wing, the outer edge and the outer edge of the hind wing are orange-brown; The 1/4 segment of the apex angle is obviously curved outward, the tip of the apex is sharp, the outer edge is slightly inward at 1/5 of the apex angle, and the middle section of the posterior and posterior wing of the fore wing has a brown line, respectively. The former is slightly curved.

The larvae feed on the leaves of Castanopsis formosana. The mature larvae spin silk and are fixed at the tip or base of the leaf where pupation takes place.

References

Moths described in 1889
Drepaninae